The Agluona  is a river of  Akmenė district municipality, Lithuania. It flows for 23.4 kilometres and has a basin area of 
188 km². It is a left tributary of the Vadakstis river (the Venta River basin).

It starts near Stipirkiai village and flows north-westwards. It meets the Vadakstis near Kesiai village, by the Latvian border.

Kivyliai settlement is located by the Agluona, where the Kivyliai Reservoir is located (area ).

The name Agluona comes from  'spruce tree'.

References

Rivers of Lithuania
Akmenė District Municipality
Venta River basin